|}

This is a list of House of Assembly results for the 1975 South Australian state election.

Results by electoral district

Adelaide

Albert Park

Alexandra 

The two candidate preferred vote was not counted between the Liberal and Liberal Movement candidates for Alexandra.

Ascot Park

Bragg

Brighton

Chaffey

Coles

Davenport

Elizabeth

Eyre

Fisher

Flinders

Florey

Frome

Gilles

Glenelg

Gouger

Goyder

Hanson

Henley Beach

Heysen

Kavel 

The two candidate preferred vote was not counted between the Liberal and Liberal Movement candidates for Kavel.

Light

Mallee 

The two candidate preferred vote was not counted between the Liberal and Country candidates for Mallee.

Mawson

Millicent

Mitcham

Mitchell

Mount Gambier

Murray

Norwood

Peake

Pirie

Playford

Price

Rocky River

Ross Smith

Salisbury

Semaphore

Spence

Stuart

Tea Tree Gully

Torrens

Unley

Victoria

Whyalla

See also
 Candidates of the 1975 South Australian state election
 Members of the South Australian House of Assembly, 1975–1977

References

1975
1975 elections in Australia
1970s in South Australia